Trinity Health Mid-Atlantic was formed in October 2018 by the joining together of Mercy Catholic Medical Center—Mercy Fitzgerald Campus in Darby, Pennsylvania; Mercy Catholic Medical Center Mercy Philadelphia Campus; Nazareth Hospital in Philadelphia, Pennsylvania; Saint Francis Healthcare in Wilmington, Delaware; St. Mary Medical Center in Langhorne, Pennsylvania; and their associated programs and services.

History 

In October 2018, St. Mary Medical Center, Saint Francis Healthcare, and the three hospitals of Mercy Health System of Southeastern Pennsylvania, joined together as one regional health system.

Mercy Health System was founded by the Sisters of Mercy more than 100 years ago in Philadelphia. The Sisters of Mercy were founded in 1831 in Dublin, Ireland by Catherine McAuley, an heiress who used her inheritance to serve the poor, especially women and children. In Catherine's House of Mercy, Sisters of Mercy cared for the poor, the sick, and the uneducated. McAuley founded 12 Mercy convents in Ireland and two in England. Twenty years after McAuley died in 1841, the Sisters of Mercy relocated to Philadelphia where they developed schools and visited the sick. In 1918, Misericordia Hospital, now Mercy Philadelphia, was founded by the Sisters of Mercy.

St. Mary Medical Center was founded by the Sisters of St. Francis who opened the Philadelphia-based, St. Mary Hospital in 1860. In 1973, the hospital relocated to Bucks County because of a regional need for health services in the county's most underserved area. And in 1996, the hospital name was changed to St. Mary Medical Center.

Saint Francis Healthcare was founded by the Sisters of Saint Francis of Philadelphia in 1924 to serve all who require expert medical care regardless of religion, race, color, creed or economic status. 

Today, Trinity Health Mid-Atlantic includes five acute care facilities, three Programs for Acute Care of the Elderly (PACE), three home health agencies, physician network and accountable care organization.

 Mercy Catholic Medical Center – Mercy Fitzgerald Campus, Darby, PA
 Mercy Catholic Medical Center – Mercy Philadelphia Campus, Philadelphia, PA
 Nazareth Hospital, Philadelphia PA
 Saint Francis Healthcare, Wilmington, DE
 St. Mary Medical Center, Langhorne, PA
 Mercy LIFE, Saint Francis LIFE and LIFE St. Mary
 Mercy Home Health, Saint Francis at Home and St. Mary Home Care
 Gateway Health Plan

Trinity Health Mid-Atlantic is the largest Catholic healthcare system serving the Greater Philadelphia area and is a member of Trinity Health, a multi-institutional, Catholic health system, sponsored by Catholic Health Ministries.

Mercy Catholic Medical Center – Mercy Fitzgerald Campus 

Mercy Fitzgerald, part of Trinity Health Mid-Atlantic, is a 204-bed teaching hospital located in Darby, Pa., which offers advanced acute care services in Delaware County and Southwest Philadelphia. In 2015, the hospital admitted 8,834 patients, cared for 41,855 people in the Emergency Department, and saw 166,028 outpatient registrations.

Mercy Fitzgerald is home to comprehensive heart and vascular care, cancer care, bariatrics, orthopedics and ambulatory services, advanced diagnostic and interventional radiology, diabetes education, a sleep center, orthopedics, wound care, acute inpatient rehabilitation, physical and occupational therapy. In 2012, a retail pharmacy was opened on Mercy Fitzgerald's campus and the hospital established a Mercy Cancer Center featuring a new Infusion Center. In 2013, a new Endoscopy Center opened with the advanced capabilities to diagnose and treat digestive disorders.

The hospital also works collaboratively with first responders and local organizations to be a healing presence in its communities, especially in times of emergencies and disasters. In 2012, it was named the recipient of the Corporate Humanitarian Award from the American Red Cross Southeastern Pennsylvania Chapter.

History 
In 1922, local banker and businessman Thomas M. Fitzgerald willed his property and funds to establish a hospital on Lansdowne Avenue in Darby, Pa. Seven years later, May Fitzgerald used $1.25 million from her late husband's trust and worked with the Archdiocese of Philadelphia to plan Delaware County's first Catholic hospital. Ground broke in 1932 and a year later, 30,000 people witnessed the dedication of the hospital, known at that time as Fitzgerald Mercy Hospital. To manage hospital operations, the Archdiocese drew upon the vast health care experience of the Sisters of Mercy—who had already experienced great success with Misericordia Hospital (now Mercy Philadelphia Hospital) that was established 15 years earlier in West Philadelphia. The Sisters agreed to rent Mercy Fitzgerald Hospital from the Archdiocese for $1 a year.

Mercy Fitzgerald was the first to introduce a hospital-administered Home Care Program in 1969, first to open an inpatient psychiatric facility in 1977, and one of the first to provide paramedic services in the early 1980s. In more recent years, the hospital was the first in the County to install the cutting-edge 64-Slice CT scanner and the first in the region to launch photo ID bracelets for patients as part of efforts to improve patient safety.

Mercy Catholic Medical Center – Mercy Philadelphia Campus 

Mercy Philadelphia (formerly Misericordia Hospital), is a 157-bed community teaching hospital, founded by the Sisters of Mercy in 1909,which serves the communities of West Philadelphia and Southwest Philadelphia.

Services include emergency, surgical, cardiac, critical care, oncology, wound care, gastroenterology, mental wellness, physical and occupational rehabilitation, vascular, interventional and diagnostic radiology—including the latest in radiation oncology and diagnostic imaging technology. Its Mercy Cancer Care program is accredited by The American College of Surgeons Commission on Cancer and is affiliated with the Jefferson Cancer Network. In addition, a partnership with Penn Cardiac Care brought cardiovascular care to the West Philadelphia community.

History 
In the summer of 1913, Mother M. Hildegarde, a Sister of Mercy, was asked by Archbishop Prendergast if the Sisters would manage a hospital in West Philadelphia; they accepted. Negotiations were begun for acquiring the lot at 54th Street and Cedar Avenue in West Philadelphia, at a cost of US$108,000.

Hildegarde recognized the need for qualified staff. Two sisters were sent to Mercy Hospital in Pittsburgh, Pennsylvania, and two others to Mercy Hospital in Baltimore, Maryland, to train to become nurses. Other sisters were registered at the College of Pharmacy and the Polyclinic Hospital in Philadelphia, for courses in pathology.

Mercy Philadelphia opened on July 2, 1918 as Misericordia Hospital. Two days later, the first patient was admitted to the hospital.

Nazareth Hospital 

Nazareth Hospital, established in 1940 by the Sisters of the Holy Family of Nazareth, serves Northeast Philadelphia with 205 acute beds and 28 skilled nursing beds.

In 2012, Nazareth expanded the community's access to emergency hip fracture repair and cardiovascular care with its therapeutic hypothermia program. An affiliate of Penn Cardiac Care, Nazareth continued to provide emergency angioplasty for patients suffering heart attacks, as well as heart diagnostics, a cath lab, a Vein Center and the Center of Wound Healing and Hyperbaric Medicine. Nazareth launched a Balance Program to prevent falls and improve quality of life for people with conditions that place them at risk.

History 
To meet the healthcare needs of Northeast Philadelphia, the Sisters of the Holy Family of Nazareth prepared to open a hospital, by sending members of the Congregation to train at hospitals throughout the country, and by raising money to build. After six years of preparation, the Sisters founded Nazareth Hospital in 1940. On March 9, Nazareth Hospital opened with 116 beds and at a cost of $800,000—financed solely by the Sisters, their families and friends.

Recognizing the necessity of partnering to strengthen the base on which the hospital was founded and of maintaining the Catholic identity of Nazareth Hospital, the Sisters transferred ownership of Nazareth Hospital to the Franciscan Health System on March 1, 1995. In 1996, through the Franciscan Health System, Nazareth Hospital became a member of Catholic Health Initiatives.

In 2001, Catholic Health Initiatives transferred ownership of several facilities, Nazareth Hospital among them, to Catholic Health East (CHE). Through this transfer, Nazareth became a member of Mercy Health System, a member of CHE. In 2013 CHE joined together with Trinity Health of Livonia, Mich., to form one Catholic health system.

Mercy LIFE (Living Independence for the Elderly) 

Mercy LIFE is a nationally recognized Program of All-inclusive Care for the Elderly (PACE). Mercy LIFE has provided a community based long-term care program for frail elders who reside in South Philadelphia, since 2001 and began serving North Philadelphia in early 2009. The program serves seniors with a range of health conditions such as chronic illness, memory loss, difficulty providing personal care such as bathing and dressing, and more.

Mercy LIFE also operates Adult Day Centers, which offer preventive healthcare as well as observe and respond to changes in each senior's health.

Mercy LIFE's services include primary care and physician specialist services, nursing care, prescribed medications, dental care, mental health services, physical, occupational and speech therapies, along with vision, hearing and foot care.

History 
In 1998, the first Mercy LIFE center opened on Columbus Boulevard with just seven participants, a few staff members, and one vehicle to provide transportation. A second center was opened in 2005. The program motivated seniors to remain active and improve their quality of life, and additional Centers were opened in North Philadelphia and Delaware County.

Mercy Home Health 
Mercy Home Health operates in Bucks County, Chester County, Delaware County, Montgomery County and Philadelphia County and serves over 27,000 people in the Philadelphia five-county area.

Mercy Home Health provides services to support the ongoing treatment of heart, cancer, orthopedic conditions and much more.

Healthcare services include: Palliative Care, Rehabilitation Therapy, In-Home Telemonitoring, Skilled Home Nursing, Post-Partum Care and Support Services.

References

External links 
 

Medical and health organizations based in Pennsylvania
Non-profit organizations based in Pennsylvania
Catholic hospital networks in the United States